The 2023 Chicago White Sox season will be the club's 124th season in Chicago, their 123rd in the American League and their 33rd at Guaranteed Rate Field. It will be their first season with new manager Pedro Grifol.

Offseason

Rule changes 
Pursuant to the CBA, new rule changes will be in place for the 2023 season:

 institution of a pitch clock between pitches;
 limits on pickoff attempts per plate appearance;
 limits on defensive shifts requiring two infielders to be on either side of second and be within the boundary of the infield; and
 larger bases (increased to 18-inch squares);

Manager 
On October 3, 2022 with 3 games left of the 2022 regular season, White Sox manager Tony La Russa announced he would step down as manager due to concerns about his health. On November 1, the White Sox hired Kansas City Royals bench coach Pedro Grifol as their 42nd manager. Grifol worked with the Kansas City Royals since 2013 and was named their bench coach in 2020.

Transactions 
December 4, 2022: RHP Mike Clevinger signs a one year, $12 million contract.

January 3, 2023: OF Andrew Benintendi signs a five year, $75 million contract.

Regular season

Game Log

|- style="background:
| 1 || March 30 || @ Astros || TBD || – || || || — || || – ||
|- style="background:
| 2 || March 31 || @ Astros || TBD || – || || || — || || – ||
|- style="background:
| 3 || April 1 || @ Astros || TBD || – || || || — || || – ||
|- style="background:
| 4 || April 2 || @ Astros || TBD || – || || || — || || – ||
|- style="background: 
| 5 || April 3 || Giants || TBD || – || || || — || || – ||
|- style="background: 
| 6 || April 5 || Giants || TBD || – || || || — || || – ||
|- style="background: 
| 7 || April 6 || Giants || TBD || – || || || — || || – ||
|- style="background: 
| 8 || April 7 || @ Pirates || 3:12pm || – || || || — || || – ||
|- style="background: 
| 9 || April 8 || @ Pirates || 5:35pm || – || || || — || || – ||
|- style="background: 
| 10 || April 9 || @ Pirates || 12:35pm || – || || || — || || – ||
|- style="background: 
| 11 || April 10 || @ Twins || 1:10pm || – || || || — || || – ||
|- style="background: 
| 12 || April 11 || @ Twins || 6:40pm || – || || || — || || – ||
|- style="background: 
| 13 || April 12 || @ Twins || 12:10pm || – || || || — || || – ||
|- style="background: 
| 14 || April 14 || Orioles || TBD || – || || || — || || – ||
|- style="background: 
| 15 || April 15 || Orioles || TBD || – || || || — || || – ||
|- style="background: 
| 16 || April 16 || Orioles || TBD || – || || || — || || – ||
|- style="background: 
| 17 || April 17 || Phillies || TBD || – || || || — || || – ||
|- style="background: 
| 18 || April 18 || Phillies || TBD || – || || || — || || – ||
|- style="background: 
| 19 || April 19 || Phillies || TBD || – || || || — || || – ||
|- style="background: 
| 20 || April 21 || @ Rays || TBD || – || || || — || || – ||
|- style="background: 
| 21 || April 22 || @ Rays || TBD || – || || || — || || – ||
|- style="background: 
| 22 || April 23 || @ Rays || TBD || – || || || — || || – ||
|- style="background: 
| 23 || April 24 || @ Blue Jays || TBD || – || || || — || || – ||
|- style="background: 
| 24 || April 25 || @ Blue Jays || TBD || – || || || — || || – ||
|- style="background: 
| 25 || April 26 || @ Blue Jays || TBD || – || || || — || || – ||
|- style="background: 
| 26 || April 27 || Rays || TBD || – || || || — || || – ||
|- style="background: 
| 27 || April 28 || Rays || TBD || – || || || — || || – ||
|- style="background: 
| 28 || April 29 || Rays || TBD || – || || || — || || – ||
|- style="background: 
| 29 || April 30 || Rays || TBD || – || || || — || || – ||
|- 

|- style="background: 
| 30 || May 2 || Twins || TBD || – || || || — || || – ||
|- style="background: 
| 31 || May 3 || Twins || TBD || – || || || — || || – ||
|- style="background: 
| 32 || May 4 || Twins || TBD || – || || || — || || – ||
|- style="background: 
| 33 || May 5 || @ Reds || TBD || – || || || — || || – ||
|- style="background: 
| 34 || May 6 || @ Reds || TBD || – || || || — || || – ||
|- style="background: 
| 35 || May 7 || @ Reds || TBD || – || || || — || || – ||
|- style="background: 
| 36 || May 8 || @ Royals || TBD || – || || || — || || – ||
|- style="background: 
| 37 || May 9 || @ Royals || TBD || – || || || — || || – ||
|- style="background: 
| 38 || May 10 || @ Royals || TBD || – || || || — || || – ||
|- style="background: 
| 39 || May 11 || @ Royals || TBD || – || || || — || || – ||
|- style="background: 
| 40 || May 12 || Astros || TBD || – || || || — || || – ||
|- style="background: 
| 41 || May 13 || Astros || TBD || – || || || — || || – ||
|- style="background: 
| 42 || May 14 || Astros || TBD || – || || || — || || – ||
|- style="background: 
| 43 || May 16 || Guardians || TBD || – || || || — || || – ||
|- style="background: 
| 44 || May 17 || Guardians || TBD || – || || || — || || – ||
|- style="background: 
| 45 || May 18 || Guardians || TBD || – || || || — || || – ||
|- style="background: 
| 46 || May 19 || Royals || TBD || – || || || — || || – ||
|- style="background: 
| 47 || May 20 || Royals || TBD || – || || || — || || – ||
|- style="background: 
| 48 || May 21 || Royals || TBD || – || || || — || || – ||
|- style="background: 
| 49 || May 22 || @ Guardians || TBD || – || || || — || || – ||
|- style="background: 
| 50 || May 23 || @ Guardians || TBD || – || || || — || || – ||
|- style="background: 
| 51 || May 24 || @ Guardians || TBD || – || || || — || || – ||
|- style="background: 
| 52 || May 25 || @ Tigers || TBD || – || || || — || || – ||
|- style="background: 
| 53 || May 26 || @ Tigers || TBD || – || || || — || || – ||
|- style="background: 
| 54 || May 27 || @ Tigers || TBD || – || || || — || || – ||
|- style="background: 
| 55 || May 28 || @ Tigers || TBD || – || || || — || || – ||
|- style="background: 
| 56 || May 29 || Angels || TBD || – || || || — || || – ||
|- style="background: 
| 57 || May 30 || Angels || TBD || – || || || — || || – ||
|- style="background: 
| 58 || May 31 || Angels || TBD || – || || || — || || – ||
|- 

|- style="background: 
| 59 || June 2 || Tigers || TBD || – || || || — || || – ||
|- style="background: 
| 60 || June 3 || Tigers || TBD || – || || || — || || – ||
|- style="background: 
| 61 || June 4 || Tigers || TBD || – || || || — || || – ||
|- style="background: 
| 62 || June 6 || @ Yankees || TBD || – || || || — || || – ||
|- style="background: 
| 63 || June 7 || @ Yankees || TBD || – || || || — || || – ||
|- style="background: 
| 64 || June 8 || @ Yankees || TBD || – || || || — || || – ||
|- style="background: 
| 65 || June 9 || Marlins || TBD || – || || || — || || – ||
|- style="background: 
| 66 || June 10 || Marlins || TBD || – || || || — || || – ||
|- style="background: 
| 67 || June 11 || Marlins || TBD || – || || || — || || – ||
|- style="background: 
| 68 || June 13 || @ Dodgers || TBD || – || || || — || || – ||
|- style="background: 
| 69 || June 14 || @ Dodgers || TBD || – || || || — || || – ||
|- style="background: 
| 70 || June 15 || @ Dodgers || TBD || – || || || — || || – ||
|- style="background: 
| 71 || June 16 || @ Mariners || TBD || – || || || — || || – ||
|- style="background: 
| 72 || June 17 || @ Mariners || TBD || – || || || — || || – ||
|- style="background: 
| 73 || June 18 || @ Mariners || TBD || – || || || — || || – ||
|- style="background: 
| 74 || June 19 || Rangers || TBD || – || || || — || || – ||
|- style="background: 
| 75 || June 20 || Rangers || TBD || – || || || — || || – ||
|- style="background: 
| 76 || June 21 || Rangers || TBD || – || || || — || || – ||
|- style="background: 
| 77 || June 23 || Red Sox || TBD || – || || || — || || – ||
|- style="background: 
| 78 || June 24 || Red Sox || TBD || – || || || — || || – ||
|- style="background: 
| 79 || June 25 || Red Sox || TBD || – || || || — || || – ||
|- style="background: 
| 80 || June 26 || @ Angels || TBD || – || || || — || || – ||
|- style="background: 
| 81 || June 27 || @ Angels || TBD || – || || || — || || – ||
|- style="background: 
| 82 || June 28 || @ Angels || TBD || – || || || — || || – ||
|- style="background: 
| 83 || June 29 || @ Angels || TBD || – || || || — || || – ||
|- style="background: 
| 84 || June 30 || @ Athletics || TBD || – || || || — || || – ||
|- 

|- style="background: 
| 85 || July 1 || @ Athletics || TBD || – || || || — || || – ||
|- style="background: 
| 86 || July 2 || @ Athletics || TBD || – || || || — || || – ||
|- style="background: 
| 87 || July 4 || Blue Jays || TBD || – || || || — || || – ||
|- style="background: 
| 88 || July 5 || Blue Jays || TBD || – || || || — || || – ||
|- style="background: 
| 89 || July 6 || Blue Jays || TBD || – || || || — || || – ||
|- style="background: 
| 90 || July 7 || Cardinals || TBD || – || || || — || || – ||
|- style="background: 
| 91 || July 8 || Cardinals || TBD || – || || || — || || – ||
|- style="background: 
| 92 || July 9 || Cardinals || TBD || – || || || — || || – ||
|-style=background:#bbbfff
|| — || July 11 || colspan="10"|93rd All-Star Game in Seattle, WA
|- style="background:
| 93 || July 14 || @ Braves || TBD || – || || || — || || – ||
|- style="background:
| 94 || July 15 || @ Braves || TBD || – || || || — || || – ||
|- style="background:
| 95 || July 16 || @ Braves || TBD || – || || || — || || – ||
|- style="background: 
| 96 || July 18 || @ Mets || TBD || – || || || — || || – ||
|- style="background: 
| 97 || July 19 || @ Mets || TBD || – || || || — || || – ||
|- style="background: 
| 98 || July 20 || @ Mets || TBD || – || || || — || || – ||
|- style="background: 
| 99 || July 21 || @ Twins || 7:10pm || – || || || — || || – ||
|- style="background: 
| 100 || July 22 || @ Twins || 6:10pm || – || || || — || || – ||
|- style="background: 
| 101 || July 23 || @ Twins || 1:10pm || – || || || — || || – ||
|- style="background: 
| 102 || July 25 || Cubs || TBD || – || || || — || || – ||
|- style="background: 
| 103 || July 26 || Cubs || TBD || – || || || — || || – ||
|- style="background: 
| 104 || July 27 || Guardians || TBD || – || || || — || || – ||
|- style="background: 
| 105 || July 28 || Guardians || TBD || – || || || — || || – ||
|- style="background: 
| 106 || July 29 || Guardians || TBD || – || || || — || || – ||
|- style="background: 
| 107 || July 30 || Guardians || TBD || – || || || — || || – ||
|- 

|- style="background: 
| 108 || August 1 || @ Rangers || TBD || – || || || — || || – ||
|- style="background: 
| 109 || August 2 || @ Rangers || TBD || – || || || — || || – ||
|- style="background: 
| 110 || August 3 || @ Rangers || TBD || – || || || — || || – ||
|- style="background: 
| 111 || August 4 || @ Guardians || TBD || – || || || — || || – ||
|- style="background: 
| 112 || August 5 || @ Guardians || TBD || – || || || — || || – ||
|- style="background: 
| 113 || August 6 || @ Guardians || TBD || – || || || — || || – ||
|- style="background: 
| 114 || August 7 || Yankees || TBD || – || || || — || || – ||
|- style="background: 
| 115 || August 8 || Yankees || TBD || – || || || — || || – ||
|- style="background: 
| 116 || August 9 || Yankees || TBD || – || || || — || || – ||
|- style="background: 
| 117 || August 11 || Brewers || TBD || – || || || — || || – ||
|- style="background: 
| 118 || August 12 || Brewers || TBD || – || || || — || || – ||
|- style="background: 
| 119 || August 13 || Brewers || TBD || – || || || — || || – ||
|- style="background: 
| 120 || August 15 || @ Cubs || TBD || – || || || — || || – ||
|- style="background: 
| 121 || August 16 || @ Cubs || TBD || – || || || — || || – ||
|- style="background: 
| 122 || August 18 || @ Rockies || TBD || – || || || — || || – ||
|- style="background: 
| 123 || August 19 || @ Rockies || TBD || – || || || — || || – ||
|- style="background: 
| 124 || August 20 || @ Rockies || TBD || – || || || — || || – ||
|- style="background: 
| 125 || August 21 || Mariners || TBD || – || || || — || || – ||
|- style="background: 
| 126 || August 22 || Mariners || TBD || – || || || — || || – ||
|- style="background: 
| 127 || August 23 || Mariners || TBD || – || || || — || || – ||
|- style="background: 
| 128 || August 24 || Athletics || TBD || – || || || — || || – ||
|- style="background: 
| 129 || August 25 || Athletics || TBD || – || || || — || || – ||
|- style="background: 
| 130 || August 26 || Athletics || TBD || – || || || — || || – ||
|- style="background: 
| 131 || August 27 || Athletics || TBD || – || || || — || || – ||
|- style="background: 
| 132 || August 28 || @ Orioles || TBD || – || || || — || || – ||
|- style="background: 
| 133 || August 29 || @ Orioles || TBD || – || || || — || || – ||
|- style="background: 
| 134 || August 30 || @ Orioles || TBD || – || || || — || || – ||
|- 

|- style="background: 
| 135 || September 1 || Tigers || TBD || – || || || — || || – ||
|- style="background: 
| 136 || September 2 || Tigers || TBD || – || || || — || || – ||
|- style="background: 
| 137 || September 3 || Tigers || TBD || – || || || — || || – ||
|- style="background: 
| 138 || September 5 || @ Royals || TBD || – || || || — || || – ||
|- style="background: 
| 139 || September 6 || @ Royals || TBD || – || || || — || || – ||
|- style="background: 
| 140 || September 7 || @ Royals || TBD || – || || || — || || – ||
|- style="background: 
| 141 || September 8 || @ Tigers || TBD || – || || || — || || – ||
|- style="background: 
| 142 || September 9 || @ Tigers || TBD || – || || || — || || – ||
|- style="background: 
| 143 || September 10 || @ Tigers || TBD || – || || || — || || – ||
|- style="background: 
| 144 || September 11 || Royals || TBD || – || || || — || || – ||
|- style="background: 
| 145 || September 12 || Royals || TBD || – || || || — || || – ||
|- style="background: 
| 146 || September 13 || Royals || TBD || – || || || — || || – ||
|- style="background: 
| 147 || September 14 || Twins || TBD || – || || || — || || – ||
|- style="background: 
| 148 || September 15 || Twins || TBD || – || || || — || || – ||
|- style="background: 
| 149 || September 16 || Twins || TBD || – || || || — || || – ||
|- style="background: 
| 150 || September 17 || Twins || TBD || – || || || — || || – ||
|- style="background: 
| 151 || September 18 || @ Nationals || TBD || – || || || — || || – ||
|- style="background: 
| 152 || September 19 || @ Nationals || TBD || – || || || — || || – ||
|- style="background: 
| 153 || September 20 || @ Nationals || TBD || – || || || — || || – ||
|- style="background: 
| 154 || September 22 || @ Red Sox || TBD || – || || || — || || – ||
|- style="background: 
| 155 || September 23 || @ Red Sox || TBD || – || || || — || || – ||
|- style="background: 
| 156 || September 24 || @ Red Sox || TBD || – || || || — || || – ||
|- style="background: 
| 157 || September 25 || Diamondbacks || TBD || – || || || — || || – ||
|- style="background: 
| 158 || September 26 || Diamondbacks || TBD || – || || || — || || – ||
|- style="background: 
| 159 || September 27 || Diamondbacks || TBD || – || || || — || || – ||
|- style="background: 
| 160 || September 29 || Padres || TBD || – || || || — || || – ||
|- style="background: 
| 161 || September 30 || Padres || TBD || – || || || — || || – ||
|- style="background: 
| 162 || October 1 || Padres || TBD || – || || || — || || – ||
|-

Roster

Farm system

References

External links
2023 Chicago White Sox season Official Site
2023 Chicago White Sox season at ESPN

Chicago White Sox seasons
Chicago White Sox
White Sox
White Sox